Ringstead Downs is a  biological Site of Special Scientific Interest east of Hunstanton in Norfolk. It is in the Norfolk Coast Area of Outstanding Natural Beauty,  and it is the western part of the  Ringstead Downs nature reserve, which is managed by the Norfolk Wildlife Trust.

This is a dry chalk valley which was carved out by glacial meltwaters It is species-rich as it has never been ploughed, and it is the largest surviving area of chalk downland surviving in the county. The butterflies are diverse.

A footpath between Ringstead and Downs Road in Hunstanton goes through the reserve.

References

Norfolk Wildlife Trust
Sites of Special Scientific Interest in Norfolk